The Franklyn Pea Bee is an American single place homebuilt aircraft, that was designed in the 1970s.

Design and development
The Pea Bee is a single place, strut-braced, low wing aircraft with conventional landing gear. The fuselage is all aluminum, the wings are of wooden construction with aluminum skins. The wings are configured with a slight anhedral.

Specifications (Pea Bee)

See also

References

Homebuilt aircraft